Elmer Torres Espiritu (born November 23, 1985) is a Filipino former professional basketball player who last played for Talk 'N Text Tropang Texters of the Philippine Basketball Association (PBA). He played five seasons for the University of the East Red Warriors in the University Athletic Association of the Philippines from 2005 to 2009. He captained the Warriors team that finished runner-up to the Ateneo de Manila Blue Eagles in the 2009 season, where he averaged 13.9 points, 7.5 rebounds and 2.6 blocks per game while winning two with the Highlight Player of the Year and the Defensive Player trophies.

Professional career

Alaska Aces
He was selected by the Alaska Aces as 4th pick overall in the 2010 PBA draft. However, Espiritu played limited minutes in the stacked Alaska squad, averaging only 4.2 minutes per game, 0.6 points per game, and 0.3 assists in his only 9 games in the Alaska Aces.

Air21 Express (first era)
On May 15, 2011, Espiritu was traded to the Air21 Express for Wesley Gonzales for the 2011 Governors' Cup after the Express and the Alaska Aces formally agreed in a trade.

Shopinas.com Clickers
On September 6, 2011, Espiritu, along with Brian Ilad, was traded from Barako Bull to the Shopinas.com Clickers in a trade that also involved Mark Barroca and Don Allado.

Barangay Ginebra San Miguel
On August 23, 2012, Espiritu was traded by Air21 to the Barangay Ginebra San Miguel along with a 2013 draft first round selection (who turned out to be Greg Slaughter) through a three-team trade.

Air21 Express (second era)
Espiritu was acquired by the second era Air21 Express (formerly Shopinas.com Clickers) from Ginebra in exchange for a 2013 first round pick that originally belonged to Talk 'N Text.

Talk 'N Text Tropang Texters
In March 2014, Espiritu was signed by the Talk 'N Text Tropang Texters.

PBA career statistics

Correct as of August 2, 2015

Season-by-season averages

|-
| align=left | 
| align=left | Alaska / Air 21
| 17 || 8.6 || .342 || .000 || .444 || 1.9 || .2 || .1 || .3 || 1.9
|-
| align=left | 
| align=left | Shopinas.com
| 27 || 24.0 || .361 || .312 || .600 || 5.2 || 1.1 || .2 || .7 || 7.0
|-
| align=left | 
| align=left | Barangay Ginebra
| 25 || 9.4 || .333 || .217 || .714 || 1.7 || .4 || .1 || .0 || 2.4
|-
| align=left | 
| align=left | Air21
| 16 || 8.0 || .375 || .500 || .500 || 1.0 || .4 || .1 || .1 || 2.4
|-
| align=left | 
| align=left | Talk 'N Text
| 16 || 3.8 || .478 || .600 || .000 || .5 || .1 || .0 || .2 || 1.8
|-
| align=left | Career
| align=left |
| 101 || 12.1 || .362 || .350 || .592 || 2.4 || .5 || .1 || .3 || 3.5

References

1985 births
Living people
Air21 Express players
Alaska Aces (PBA) players
Barako Bull Energy players
Barangay Ginebra San Miguel players
Filipino men's basketball players
JRU Heavy Bombers basketball players
Philippine Patriots players
Power forwards (basketball)
Small forwards
Basketball players from Manila
TNT Tropang Giga players
UE Red Warriors basketball players
TNT Tropang Giga draft picks